A Drug Problem That Never Existed is the second studio album by American rock band Mondo Generator. It takes its name from a line in The Frogs' "I've Got Drugs (Out of the Mist)", from their album It's Only Right and Natural. Much of the material was inspired by mixed emotions brought about by the divorce of singer Nick Oliveri and also his substance abuses and the death of his father.

The tracks "Jr. High Love" and "Day I Die" were previously recorded by Oliveri and others at The Desert Sessions, "Jr. High Love" for Volumes 3 & 4 and "Day I Die" for Volumes 5 & 6 under the name "I'm Dead". "Girl's Like Christ" is a reworking of a Dwarves song "There She Goes Again" written by Blag Dahlia and Nick Oliveri during his time with the band.

Track listing

Several editions contain an advert for future releases of RekordsRekords as a hidden track.

Credits

Band members
 Nick Oliveri
 Brant Bjork
 Molly McGuire
 Dave Catching

Additional musicians
 Rex Everything
 Pierre Pressure
 Mark Lanegan
 Josh Homme
 Troy Van Leeuwen
 Josh Freese
 Ashlee S.
 Marc Diamond
 Sean D.
 Blag Jesus
 Alain Johannes
 Carlo Von Sexron

Additional credits
Produced by Nick Oliveri, Brad Cook, & Blag Dahlia, except "Detroit" & "Day I Die" produced by Nick Oliveri.

Engineered by: Nick Raskulinecz @ Grand Master Studios,
Greedy Bros. @ Castle Prod. Studios,
Troy Van Leeuwen @ CGI Australia,
Alain Johannes @ II A.D. Studios

Mastered by Alain Johannes at II A.D. Studios.

All Tracks Mixed by Brad Cook, except "Detroit" mixed by Alain Johannes & "Day I Die" by Nick Raskulinecz.

All songs published by Nick Oliveri/Natural Light Music BMI (Tracks 2, 3, 5, 6, 8, 12, 13), Brad Cook/Electro Vox Music ASCAP (1), Blag Dahlia/Six Point Prime BMI (10), Nick Oliveri & Josh Homme/Board Stiff Music BMI (4, 9), Nick Oliveri & Blag Dahlia (7, 11), and Nick Oliveri & Deborah Viereck (14).

References

Ipecac Recordings albums
Mondo Generator albums
2003 albums